Ashel Cunningham was an American football, basketball, and baseball coach.

DePauw University
He served as the head football coach at DePauw University in Greencastle, Indiana in 1912. He also served as the school's head men's basketball coach from 1911 to 1913.

University of Redlands
He became an athletic coach at the University of Redlands in Redlands, California in 1913. He served as the school's head football coach from 1915 to 1920 and head men's basketball coach from 1917 to 1922 and 1926 to 1944.

The track and field facility at Redlands bears his name.

References

Year of birth missing
Year of death missing
American football quarterbacks
DePauw Tigers athletic directors
DePauw Tigers football coaches
DePauw Tigers men's basketball coaches
Indiana Hoosiers baseball coaches
Indiana Hoosiers baseball players
Indiana Hoosiers football coaches
Indiana Hoosiers football players
Indiana University Maurer School of Law alumni
Redlands Bulldogs football coaches
Redlands Bulldogs men's basketball coaches